Prime Directive is an album by jazz bassist Dave Holland's Quintet released on the ECM label in 1999. It features Holland with saxophonist Chris Potter, trombonist Robin Eubanks, vibraphonist Steve Nelson and drummer Billy Kilson.           
Holland was asked about the album’s title on the web site "Innerviews":It started with a conversation with my wife I had when we were just putting this band together. I had been in a few situations which were not really fun, but musically good. There were problems of one sort or another. I decided at this stage in my life that I wanted to enjoy music. I have to say one of the things that really influenced me is my time recently with Herbie Hancock. I’ve worked with him on and off from ’91 to ’96 in trio and quartet formats. Herbie enjoys himself whenever he plays. He has a lot of fun and it doesn’t stop him from being creative or playing amazingly inventively. That was when a sort of release occurred and a cognition formed. Until then, I took music quite seriously and was prepared to put up with certain things in order to have certain other things happen. Then I decided if I wasn’t enjoying myself, something was wrong and it had to be changed. And then it got to simplifying that statement into "If it’s not fun, we’ve got to do something different." Then I said to my wife "That’s got to be the prime directive of this band" and that’s how the whole thing got started.(emphasis added)

Reception
The AllMusic review by Brian Bartolini awarded the album 4½ stars, stating, "Tremendous taste prevents Holland from making unsatisfying music. He is a great leader in the truest senses of the word -- he gives his team space, trusts their abilities and judgment, yet all the while remains firmly in command and infuses the results with his own style and personality. Prime Directive is a wonderful jazz album. These 77 minutes and nine tracks do not cheat or disappoint... Prime Directive is recommended; a great leader is, indeed, hard to find". 
In 2000 the well-respected Jazz Journalists Association honored the recording with their award Album of the Year.

Track listing
All compositions by Dave Holland except as indicated
 "Prime Directive" - 7:46
 "Looking Up" - 13:32
 "Make Believe" - 6:25
 "A Seeking Spirit" (Robin Eubanks) - 11:21
 "High Wire" (Chris Potter) - 6:49
 "Jugglers Parade" - 8:14
 "Candelight Vigil" (Steve Nelson) - 4:51
 "Wonders Never Cease" (Billy Kilson) - 13:55
 "Down Time" - 3:48
Recorded at Avatar Studios in New York City on 10–12 December 1998

Personnel
Dave Holland - double bass
Chris Potter - soprano saxophone, alto saxophone, tenor saxophone
Robin Eubanks - trombone
Steve Nelson - vibraphone, marimba
Billy Kilson - drums

References

External links

Dave Holland albums
1999 albums
ECM Records albums